Gerd Siegmund (born 7 February 1973) is an East German/German former ski jumper.

Career
He won a silver medal in the team large hill at the 1995 FIS Nordic World Ski Championships in Thunder Bay, Ontario and finished 10th in the individual large hill at those same championships. Siegmund finished 11th in the individual normal hill at the 1994 Winter Olympics in Lillehammer. His best finish at the Ski-flying World Championships was 26th at Planica in 1994. Siegmund's only individual career victory was at Thunder Bay in 1994 in the individual normal hill.

World Cup

Standings

Wins

External links 

German male ski jumpers
1973 births
Ski jumpers at the 1994 Winter Olympics
Living people
Sportspeople from Dresden
FIS Nordic World Ski Championships medalists in ski jumping
Olympic ski jumpers of Germany